Somero Glacier is a tributary glacier 7 nautical miles (13 km) long, flowing northwest from Mount Fairweather to enter Liv Glacier just south of the west end of the Duncan Mountains. Named by Advisory Committee on Antarctic Names (US-ACAN) for George N. Somero, United States Antarctic Research Program (USARP) biologist at McMurdo Station, 1963–64, and winter 1965.

Glaciers of Amundsen Coast